Alpine Lake / Ata Puai is a small lake in the West Coast Region of New Zealand. "Alpine" is something of a misnomer as the lake is only  from the sea and at an elevation of less than 100m.

References

Westland District
Lakes of the West Coast, New Zealand